Lazarevo is a rural locality (a selo) in Kovarditskoye Rural Settlement, Muromsky District, Vladimir Oblast, Russia. The population was 274 as of 2010. There are 13 streets.

Geography 
Lazarevo is located 8 km southwest of Murom (the district's administrative centre) by road. Koldino is the nearest rural locality.

References 

Rural localities in Muromsky District